Rhynchodia mesophaea is the only species in the monotypic moth genus Rhynchodia of the family Noctuidae. It is found in the Indian state of Kerala. Both the genus and species were first described by George Hampson in 1910.

References

Acontiinae